Taipan LRT station is a light rapid transit station at the top of Persiaran Kewajipan road, sandwiched between the neighbourhood of USJ6 and USJ8 in UEP Subang Jaya, Subang Jaya, Selangor, Malaysia. The station serves the nearby USJ 6, USJ 8, and USJ 10 neighbourhoods.

The station is operated under the Kelana Jaya LRT system network as found on station signage. Like most other LRT stations operating in Klang Valley, this station is elevated.

Bus Services

Feeder buses

Other buses

Around the station
 Taipan Business Center
 USJ 8 Police Station
 IPD Subang Jaya
 Subang Perdana Goodyear Court 3, 4 & 5
 USJ 10, 9, 8, 7 & 6
 Subang Business Center
 Masjid Al-Fallah

External links 
 Taipan LRT Station

Kelana Jaya Line
Railway stations opened in 2016
Subang Jaya